Louise Witzig (1901-1969) was a Swiss photographer and folklorist, researcher of traditional costumes, folk dances and customs. Member of the executive board of the International Folk Music Council (1947).

Publications 
 12 Schweizer Tänze. Schweizerische Tanzweisen mit Tanzanweisungen. Zürich [1939] (in collaboration with Alfred und Klara Stern and Ingeborg Grau).
 Volkstänze der Schweiz. Heft 1.' Grundschritte - Paartänze - 12 Tanzweisen. Zürich [1952], 2. Auﬂage (in collaboration with Alfred Stern).
 Volkstänze der Schweiz. Heft 2: Volkstänze der alemannischen Schweiz. Zürich [1950].
 Schweizer Trachtenbuch mit 60 Farbtafeln und 200 Schwarzweiss-Abbildungen, [1954], in the German language, 279 pages.

References 

1901 births
Swiss folklorists
Swiss photographers
1969 deaths